Hexanal, also called hexanaldehyde or caproaldehyde is an alkyl aldehyde used in the flavor industry to produce fruity flavors. Its scent resembles freshly cut grass, like cis-3-hexenal.  It is potentially useful as a natural extract that prevents fruit spoilage. It occurs naturally, and contributes to a hay-like "off-note" flavor in green peas.

The first synthesis of hexanal was published in 1907 by P. Bagard.

References

Alkanals
Substances discovered in the 1900s